Lords of the Liverdance is the third album of Finnish psytrance-duo Eraser vs Yöjalka. It was released on June, 2006 by Australian record label Faerie Dragon Records.

Track listing
 "Nice to Mute You" – 6:56
 "Nuts for Nothing" – 6:13
 "Brain to Feet" – 5:41
 "Hell Sin Key THCruise" – 5:01
 "High on Heels" – 6:38
 "Faster.Liver.Dancer" – 5:26
 "Nolerco" (EvsY Remix) – 6:20
 "Kaliman Kakarat" – 6:35
 "Home Deep Home" – 6:00
 "Sky Breaks" – 3:23

External links 
 Official homepage of Eraser vs Yöjalka
 Information and samples of Lords of the Liverdance at Sonic Dragon website

2006 albums
Eraser vs Yöjalka albums